Isar Rural District is in Isar District of Marvast County, Yazd province, Iran. At the National Census of 2006, its population was 2,502 in 622 households, when it was in Marvast District of Khatam County. There were 2,621 inhabitants in 682 households at the following census of 2011. At the most recent census of 2016, the population of the rural district was 2,524 in 721 households. The largest of its 32 villages was Korkhongan, with 1,488 people. After the census, the rural district was elevated to the status of a district and split into two rural districts and no cities.

References 

Rural Districts of Yazd Province

Populated places in Yazd Province